Grennell is a surname. Notable people with the surname include:

 Airini Grennell (1910–1988),  New Zealand singer, pianist, and broadcaster
 Dean Grennell (1923–2004), American firearms expert and science fiction author

George Grennell Jr. (1786–1877), American politician

See also 

 Grinnell (surname)